Tanypodinae is a subfamily of midges in the non-biting midge family (Chironomidae). The larvae are generally carnivorous and their mouthparts are adapted for predation on small invertebrates (including other chironomid larvae) although 1st and 2nd instar larvae also feed on algae.

Tribes & genera
Tribe Anatopyniini
Anatopynia Johannsen, 1905
Tribe Clinotanypodini
Coelotanypus Kieffer, 1913
Clinotanypus Kieffer, 1913
Tribe Macropelopiini
Apsectrotanypus Fittkau, 1962
Macropelopia Thienemann, 1916
Psectrotanypus Kieffer, 1909
Tribe Natarsiini
Natarsia Fittkau, 1962
Tribe Pentaneurini
Ablabesmyia Johannsen, 1905
Arctopelopia Fittkau, 1962
Coffmania Hazra & Chaudhuri, 2000
Conchapelopia Fittkau, 1957
Guttipelopia Fittkau, 1962
Hayesomyia Murray & Fittkau, 1985
Helopelopia Roback, 1971
Hudsonimyia Roback, 1979
Krenopelopia Fittkau, 1962
Labrundinia Fittkau, 1962
Larsia Fittkau, 1962
Monopelopia Fittkau, 1962
Nilotanypus Kieffer, 1923
Paramerina Fittkau, 1962
Pentaneura Philippi, 1865
Rheopelopia Fittkau, 1962
Schineriella Murray & Fittkau, 1988
Telmatopelopia Fittkau, 1962
Thienemannimyia Fittkau, 1957
Trissopelopia Kieffer, 1923
Xenopelopia Fittkau, 1962
Zavrelimyia Fittkau, 1962
Tribe Procladiini
Procladius Skuse, 1889
Tribe Tanypodini
Tanypus Meigen, 1803

References